The 2019 Kremlin Cup was an international professional ten-ball pool tournament held between 17–21 September in Moscow, Russia.

Tyler Styer won the event, defeating David Alcaide in the final 8 racks to 7.

References

2019 in cue sports
Kremlin World Cup
Kremlin World Cup
Kremlin Cup (pool)